Yadi (also Romanized as Yadī; also known as Beyt-e Yadī) is a village in Ahudasht Rural District, Shavur District, Shush County, Khuzestan Province, Iran. At the 2006 census, its population was 196, in 27 families.

References 

Populated places in Shush County